Western Australia, a state of Australia and formerly a British colony, established its postal service soon after the British settled in 1829; in December of that year, Fremantle's harbourmaster was appointed postmaster.  A post office in Albany opened on 14 October 1834, and the main post office moved to Perth in 1835.

First stamps

The colony issued its first postage stamp on 1 August 1854. The 1d black stamp featured the black swan, a design used for most of the colony's later stamps as well.  This stamp was engraved in England and printed by Perkins Bacon; later in the year, local lithographer Horace Samson produced 4d and 1sh values by taking an impression of the 1d's swan vignette and adding different frames.  Alfred Hillman's mistake in the repair of the printing stones in 1855 resulted in the frame being inverted, yielding the extremely rare Inverted Swan error.

Later issues

In 1857, Hillman produced 2d and 6d values of the swan design by imitating the existing stamps, though with the swan on a blank background, but these were only used until 1860 when Perkins Bacon plates of the 1854 design were used in Perth to print all values.

A new swan design, for the 3d value, appeared in 1872, and variations on it finally superseded the 1854 design starting in 1885, with a definitive series of eight values.

After federation, the states continued to operate their postal systems, and 1902 saw a new series of swan definitives, along with stamps depicting Queen Victoria for the first time, on the values from 2 shillings to 1 pound.  The Victoria stamps are also unusual in having the inscription read "WEST AUSTRALIA" instead of "WESTERN AUSTRALIA" as was the norm.  These stamps continued in daily use until Commonwealth stamps were issued in 1913.

See also
Postage stamps and postal history of Australia
Revenue stamps of Western Australia

References and sources

References

Sources
 Stanley Gibbons Ltd: various catalogues

History of Western Australia
Philately of Australia
Postal history of Australia
Postage stamps of Australia